Mike L. Murphy (born January 29, 1975, in Los Gatos, California) is an American animation director and animator in film and television.

Background
Murphy grew up in Los Gatos, California and left high school a year early after getting a tour of Walt Disney Feature Animation studios while they were making Aladdin.  He subsequently attended California Institute of the Arts in Valencia, California.

Career
Murphy's first film as director was his 2004 Night of the Broccoli, about a man whose dinner vegetables exact a revenge.  This was followed by his 2005 film Get Lost, and then by his 2006 film Rose, which premiered at the Rhode Island International Film Festival, and won 1st place for cinematography.  His works include the films Harry Potter and the Sorcerer's Stone, The Lord of the Rings: The Two Towers, and Iron Man.  In 2010 he directed the animated sequences for 20th Century Fox's Diary of a Wimpy Kid.  In 2011 he was the director and producer of the Young Storytellers Foundation "Bohemian Dream Party", a charity event to benefit arts education for Los Angeles-based youth. He also redesigned Mrs. Butterworth and directed her animation.

Filmography
 Night of the Broccoli (2004)
 Get Lost (2005)
 Rose (2006)

References

External links

Official website

1975 births
American animators
American animated film directors
American male screenwriters
Living people
Artists from the San Francisco Bay Area
Film directors from California
Writers from the San Francisco Bay Area
People from Los Gatos, California
Screenwriters from California